Dolichyl pyrophosphate Man9GlcNAc2 alpha-1,3-glucosyltransferase is an enzyme that in humans is encoded by the ALG6 gene.

Function 

This gene encodes a member of the ALG6/ALG8 glucosyltransferase family. The encoded protein catalyzes the addition of the first glucose residue to the growing lipid-linked oligosaccharide precursor of N-linked glycosylation. Mutations in this gene are associated with congenital disorders of glycosylation type Ic.

References

Further reading

External links 
  GeneReviews/NCBI/NIH/UW entry on Congenital Disorders of Glycosylation Overview